Fadıl Öztürk (1955, Tunceli, Turkey) is a Kurdish writer and poet. He continues to write literary and political work. He was jailed for ten years. On 8 December 2004, he took part of the campaigned 'Demands of Kurds in Turkey' that has been published as a half page advert on Herald Tribune. In December 2005, he took part with 135 artists in the campaign supporting the Kurdish Television Channel Roj TV.

Works

Poem Books
 Hep kuzeydi gözlerin
 Ateşe konuş Küle Ağa
 Esmer bir acı
 Suyu uyandırım sesim olsun

External links
Book
Poems

Turkish-language poets
Turkish-language writers
Living people
1955 births